The following page lists all public utilities in the U.S. state of Arkansas.

Electric utilities

Water utilities

See also
List of power stations in Arkansas
Energy in Arkansas

References

Energy in Arkansas
Arkansas-related lists